William de Turbeville (or William Turbe;  –  January 1174) was a medieval Bishop of Norwich.

Life
Turbeville was educated in the Benedictine priory of Norwich Cathedral. Here he also made religious profession, first as a teacher and later as prior. He first held the office of precentor of the Diocese of Norwich from about 1136, and was subsequently Prior of Norwich.

Turbeville was present at the Easter synod of 1144 when Godwin Stuart alleged that his nephew, William of Norwich, a boy of about twelve years, had been murdered by the Norwich Jews during the preceding Holy Week.

When Turbeville became bishop in 1146 or early 1147 he propagated the cult of the "boy-martyr". On four occasions he had the boy's remains transferred to more honourable places, and in 1168 erected a chapel in his honour in Mousehold Wood, where the boy's body was said to have been found. He persuaded Thomas of Monmouth, a monk of Norwich priory, to write "The Life and Miracles of St William of Norwich" about 1173, the only extant authority for the legend of William, which is now commonly discredited.

Turbeville attended the Council of Rheims in 1148.

Turbeville died on 16 January 1174 or 17 January 1174.

Citations

References
 British History Online Bishops of Norwich accessed on 29 October 2007
 British History Online Priors of Norwich accessed on 29 October 2007
 
 

1090s births
1174 deaths
Bishops of Norwich
12th-century English Roman Catholic bishops